The Hirth F-263 is a twin cylinder, in-line, two stroke, carburetted aircraft engine that was designed for use on ultralight aircraft.  It was manufactured by Hirth of Germany, but was discontinued about 2001.

Development
The F-263 uses fan cooling and piston-ported induction, with a single Bing carburetor and single capacitor discharge ignition. The cylinder walls are electrochemically coated with Nikasil. Standard starting is recoil start. A gearbox reduction drive system and electric start were factory options.

The engine produces  and runs on a 50:1 pre-mix of unleaded 93 octane auto fuel and oil. Recommended time between overhauls is 1000 hours.

Applications
Howland H-3 Pegasus
Falconar HM-293

Specifications (F-263)

See also

References

Hirth aircraft engines
Air-cooled aircraft piston engines
Two-stroke aircraft piston engines